Rock Grove Township is located in Stephenson County, Illinois. As of the 2010 census, its population was 1,388 and it contained 761 housing units. The unincorporated community of Rock Grove is located in the township, and once Duncannon was located here also.

Geography
Rock Grove is Township 28 (part) and 29 North, Range 8 (part) and 9 East of the Fourth Principal Meridian.

Demographics

References

External links
 City-data.com
 Stephenson County Official Site

Townships in Stephenson County, Illinois
Townships in Illinois